Charles Eaton Haynes (April 15, 1784 – August 29, 1841) was an American politician and physician.

Early years and education
Haynes was born in Brunswick, Virginia, in Mecklenburg County in 1784, Haynes graduated from the University of Pennsylvania School of Medicine in Philadelphia, Pennsylvania, and practiced medicine.

Political career
Haynes was elected as a Jacksonian Representative of Georgia to the 19th, 20th and 21st United States Congresses and served from March 4, 1825, until March 3, 1831. He lost his bid for reelection in 1830 to the 22nd Congress and ran another unsuccessful campaign for the 23rd Congress.

Haynes returned to the U.S. Congress as a Jacksonian after winning election to the 24th Congress and reelection to that seat for the 25th Congress. His return to Congress spanned from March 4, 1835, until March 3, 1839.

Death and legacy
Haynes died on August 29, 1841 and was buried in Sparta, Georgia.

References

External links 

 Stuart A. Rose Manuscript, Archives, and Rare Book Library, Emory University: Charles Eaton Haynes papers, 1827-1838

1784 births
1841 deaths
Democratic Party members of the United States House of Representatives from Georgia (U.S. state)
19th-century American physicians
People from Mecklenburg County, Virginia
People from Sparta, Georgia
Jacksonian members of the United States House of Representatives from Georgia (U.S. state)
19th-century American politicians